Mary Magdalene is an oil on panel painting of Mary Magdalene, dating to around 1500 and now in the Galleria Palatina in Florence - it has featured in its inventory since 1641. It is now attributed to Perugino. It is modelled on his wife Chiara Fancelli, who also modelled for several of his Madonnas. It is comparable to his Madonna and Child with St John the Baptist and St Catherine of Alexandria (Louvre), of similar date and with a similar dark background.

In the inventory of 1691 it was attributed to Raphael. From 1695 onwards it was considered to be a pendant to Young Man with an Apple, generally attributed to Raphael. It was sent to Palermo from 1797 to 1803 as a work by Franciabigio, but around that time a new hypothesis held it to be by Leonardo da Vinci and completed by Luigi Lanzi. In the 1810, 1815 and 1829 inventories it was attributed to Giacomo Francia.

References

Bibliography 
 Vittoria Garibaldi, Perugino, in Pittori del Rinascimento, Scala, Florence, 2004 
 Pierluigi De Vecchi, Elda Cerchiari, I tempi dell'arte, volume 2, Bompiani, Milan, 1999 
 Stefano Zuffi, Il Quattrocento, Electa, Milan, 2004 
 Entry on Polomuseale.firenze.it

1500s paintings
Paintings by Pietro Perugino
Paintings in the collection of the Galleria Palatina
Perugino